Hundred is based on the light novel series of the same name written by Jun Misaki and illustrated by Nekosuke Ōkuma. The series adaptation was announced in the ninth volume's cover. It was produced by Production IMS and directed by Tomoki Kobayashi. It aired from April 5 to June 20, 2016. The opening theme is "Bloodred" by D-Selections, and the first ending theme is "Eyes On Me" by Rumi Ōkubo and Mayu Yoshioka. The second ending theme is "Tabooless" by M.A.O, Rika Kinugawa, and Yui Makino. The third ending theme is "Hardy Buddy" by Yuka Ōtsubo and Wataru Hatano. The fourth ending theme is "Jewels of Love" by Mayu Yoshioka and Kaya Okuno. Funimation has licensed the series in North America.


Episode list

Home Media release

Japanese

English

References

Hundred